Jasmine (stylized as JASMINE) (born May 19, 1989), is a Japanese singer and songwriter from Tokyo. She is represented by Sony Music Japan, and is a DJ for the Japanese radio station J-Wave. In June 2009 she released her debut single "Sad to Say". Described as "the next Hikaru Utada", Jasmine cites Utada as her influence.

Biography

Background information 
Jasmine first experienced singing at thirteen years old, in a gospel choir at Yokota Air Base. It was here that her interest in gospel music began. Jasmine soon joined the American Expedition Choir. She decided to become a professional singer at the age of seventeen, and began writing her own lyrics and music. She soon signed a contract with Sony Music in Japan.

2009–present: Debut and first album 
Jasmine released her debut single "Sad to Say" on June 24, 2009. Previous to this date the song was released as a ringtone on the Chaku-Uta Full chart, where it debuted at number one. With this, Jasmine became the first singer to debut at number one with their debut song on the chart. Soon after the release of "Sad to Say", critics began calling Jasmine "the reincarnation of Hikaru Utada" and compared the two's choice of promoting only through radio appearances. After debuting at number thirteen on the Oricon singles chart, the single later peaked at number ten in its second week. The single has since become her most successful, peaking at number one on the digital charts and selling in excess of 30,000 physical copies in Japan.

On October 25, 2009, Jasmine had her debut live performance at the Saitama Super Arena, as a special guest for American singer Ne-Yo. Her performance coincided with the release of her second single "No More" on October 28. The song became her second top five entry on the digital charts when it debuted at the fifth position. It was also a top twenty single on the Oricon chart, debuting at number fifteen.

Jasmine returned in 2010 with set of three singles, each released within a month of each other. The first of the three, "This Is Not a Game", was released on March 3 and was limited to 10,000 copies. The song was used the opening theme for NTV's Music Fighter that month. A cover of "My Life, My Love, My All" by Kirk Franklin was featured as the single's b-side, a reference to Jasmine's gospel roots. The single debuted at twenty-three on the Oricon charts and charted for four weeks. Follow up single "Jealous" was released on April 7 and was again limited to 10,000 copies. The single featured a second gospel cover. This time it was "I Need You to Survive" by Hezekiah Walker. The single became Jasmine's third top twenty single on the Oricon chart. Jasmine's fifth single "Dreamin'" was then released on May 12. This single was produced by Jeff Miyahara, much like Jasmine's four previous A-sides, and became a top forty single on the Oricon chart.

Over a year after her debut, Jasmine's debut album, Gold, was released throughout Japan on July 21, 2010. After that, Jasmine held her first national tour JASMINE LIVE TOUR 2010〜GOLD〜 with 7 dates.

Her 6th single was released in February 2011, ONE, produced by Norgewian team Stargate. In the same year, she released the single Only One. In 2012, she released the single Best Partner. In 2013, she released the singles High Flying and HERO, changing her sound to contemporary EDM. Her second album, Complexxx followed them., containing songs from all previous singles and others new.

In 2014, Jasmine released her third studio album and her first concept album, called Welcome to Jas Vegas, and in October of the same year, she released her first best of album called Pure Love Best. From 2013 until 2017, JASMINE held her club tour Jas Vegas, until her fanclub closed.

Discography

Albums

Studio albums

Compilation albums

Extended plays

Singles

As lead artist

As featured artist

Promotional singles

Other appearances

Notes

References

External links 
 Official website 
 Oricon profile 
 Jasmine on Sony Music 

1989 births
Living people
Japanese women pop singers
Japanese rhythm and blues singers
Singers from Tokyo
21st-century Japanese singers
21st-century Japanese women singers